Lafon or LaFon may refer to:

Places
 Lafon County, an administrative area in South Sudan
 Lafon, South Sudan, the headquarters of Lafon County

People with the surname
 Barthelemy Lafon (1769–1820), architect, engineer, city planner and surveyor in late colonial-period New Orleans
 Chantal Lafon (born 1965), French rower
 Jacky Lafon, an actress
 Jean-Jacques Lafon (born 1955), French singer-songwriter (one-hit wonder ) and painter
Marie-Hélène Lafon (born 1962), French educator and writer
 Mathieu Lafon (born 1984). French professional football player.
 Pauline LaFon Gore, mother of former United States Vice President Al Gore
 Phil Lafon, Canadian pro wrestler
 Thomy Lafon (1810–1893), Creole business man, philanthropist and human rights activist
 William M. LaFon, President of the West Virginia Senate from 1939 to 1941

See also
 Lafond
 Laffon, a surname
 Laffoon, a surname

French-language surnames